Leonardo Filipe Cruz Lelo (born 30 March 2000) is a Portuguese professional footballer who plays as a left-back for Casa Pia.

Career
Lelo is a product of the youth academy of Olhanense, with stints at the academies of Vitória Setúbal and Louletano in 2016–17. He joined Portimonense on loan for the 2020–21 season, where he played for their U23 side. He moved to the senior team of Olhanense in 2018. On 16 June 2021, he transferred to Casa Pia in the Liga Portugal 2. He made his professional debut with Casa Pia in a 4–1 Taça da Liga win over Académico de Viseu on 24 July 2021, scoring a goal in the 19th minute.

International career
Lelo is a youth international for Portugal, having represented the Portugal U20s in 2019.

References

External links
 
 

2000 births
Living people
People from Olhão
Portuguese footballers
Portugal youth international footballers
Association football fullbacks
Portimonense S.C. players
S.C. Olhanense players
Casa Pia A.C. players
Liga Portugal 2 players
Campeonato de Portugal (league) players